Felicia Ragland (born February 3, 1980) is an American former professional basketball player who played four seasons in the WNBA.

College
After playing for the Beavers for four years, Ragland ranked in the school's top-10 all-time in 14 different statistical categories. In 2001, she became the third Oregon State player to earn Pac-12 Conference Women's Basketball Player of the Year. She was the first women's basketball player to be drafted by the WNBA when she was picked in the 2002 WNBA Draft.

Oregon State statistics

Source

Honors and awards
Two-time honorable mention Associated Press 
Two-time Kodak District 8 All-American
Three-time Pacific-10 Conference first team pick
2001 Pac-10 Player of the Year
Jersey retired at Oregon State

References

External links
Felicia Ragland WNBA Stats | Basketball-Reference.com

1980 births
Living people
Houston Comets players
Oregon State Beavers women's basketball players
People from Tulare, California
Phoenix Mercury players
Seattle Storm draft picks
Seattle Storm players